John Brown was the reeve of Richmond Hill, Ontario, Canada from 1883 to 1884.  He also server as a councillor on the Richmond Hill Village Council in 1874.

Brown opened a grocery store in Richmond Hill in 1872.  In 1873, the village council appointed Brown a license inspector.  He was elected to the village council as a councillor in 1874, serving for one year.  He was elected reeve of Richmond Hill in 1883, and again in 1884.

He closed his grocery store in 1884.

References 

Mayors of Richmond Hill, Ontario
Year of birth missing
Year of death missing